Dakota Devon Allen (born November 2, 1995) is an American football linebacker who is a free agent. He played college football at Texas Tech and East Mississippi Community College.

Early life and high school
Allen was born in Dallas, Texas and grew up in Humble, Texas. He attended Summer Creek High School and was a standout football player for the Bulldogs. As a senior, he recorded 112 tackles and three interceptions and was named the Defensive MVP of District 19-4A. He committed to play college football at Texas Tech over offers from Oklahoma, TCU, Kansas State, and Iowa State.

College career
Allen began his collegiate career at Texas Tech, redshirting his freshman season. As a redshirt freshman, Allen was the Red Raiders' second-leading tackler with 87 stops. After the end of the season, he was charged with second-degree burglary along with two teammates and ultimately expelled from Texas Tech. All charges were eventually dropped against Allen after agreeing to enter a pre-trial diversionary program.

Following his dismissal, he transferred to East Mississippi Community College, where he was featured in the  second season of the Netflix documentary series Last Chance U.  Allen recorded a team leading 117 tackles with two sacks, an interception, a forced fumble, a fumble recovery and five pass breakups. Despite success on the field early in the season, he only originally received scholarship offers from Bowling Green and Troy due to his previous arrest. Allen later received offers from Ole Miss, Mississippi State and Marshall, but opted to return to Texas Tech to finish his collegiate career.

Allen had a breakout junior season in 2017, with 92 tackles, 12 tackles for loss, and six forced turnovers. He was subsequently named to the All-Big 12 by Pro Football Focus and to the second-team All-Big 12 by coaches and media. As a senior, Allen made 73 total tackles, including 6.5 for loss, and was named first-team All-Big 12.

Professional career

Los Angeles Rams
Allen was drafted by the Los Angeles Rams in the seventh round (251st overall) of the 2019 NFL Draft. Allen signed a four-year $2,594,288 contract with a signing bonus of $74,288 on June 7, 2019. He was waived during final roster cuts on August 31, 2019, but was signed to the practice squad the following day.

Oakland Raiders
On September 24, 2019, Allen was signed by the Oakland Raiders off the Rams practice squad. Allen made his NFL debut on October 6, 2019, against the Chicago Bears, playing eight snaps on special teams. He was waived on October 30 after appearing in two games for the Raiders.

Los Angeles Rams (second stint)
On November 4, 2019, Allen was signed to the Los Angeles Rams practice squad.

Jacksonville Jaguars
On December 10, 2019, Allen was signed by the Jacksonville Jaguars off the Rams practice squad. After appearing mostly in the field goal defense. Allen replaced starter Myles Jack in week 4 of the 2020 NFL season during the second half of the game against the Cincinnati Bengals. In 2020, Allen played in 13 games with the Jaguars, he started two and played mostly on special teams. He has 14 tackles (nine solo), four special teams tackles and three loss tackles this season.

Allen signed an exclusive-rights free agent tender with the Jaguars on April 15, 2021.

Cleveland Browns
On June 21, 2022, Allen signed with the Cleveland Browns. Allen was waived by the Browns on August 30, 2022. The Browns signed Allen to their practice squad on August 31, 2022. He was signed to the active roster on October 15, 2022. He was waived three days later.

Denver Broncos
On November 22, 2022, Allen was signed by the Denver Broncos off the Browns practice squad. he become free agent for 2023 season

References

External links
Denver Broncos bio
Texas Tech Red Raiders bio

1995 births
Living people
People from Humble, Texas
Players of American football from Texas
Sportspeople from Harris County, Texas
American football linebackers
East Mississippi Lions football players
Texas Tech Red Raiders football players
Los Angeles Rams players
Oakland Raiders players
Jacksonville Jaguars players
Cleveland Browns players
Denver Broncos players